Sagar Pictures Entertainment is an Indian film and television production company based in Mumbai, India. It was founded by Ramanand Sagar and is a part of the Sagar Group of companies owned by the Sagar family.

Sagar Pictures is also a dubbing studio that has dubbed for hundreds of foreign Television programs, films, and documentaries.

Movies produced 
 1971 (2007)
 Mitwaa (2015)
 Salma (1985)
 Romance (1983)
 Baghavat (1982)
 Armaan (1981)
 Prem Bandhan (1979)
 Charas (1976)
 Jalte Badan (1973)
 Lalkaar (1972)
 Geet (1970)

TV series produced

References

External links 
 

Film production companies based in Mumbai
Hindi cinema
Indian dubbing studios
Television production companies of India
indian dubbing sohil kuswah